Chalmeh (also Romanized as Chālmeh) is a village in Chahak Rural District, in the Central District of Khatam County, Yazd Province, Iran. At the 2006 census, its population was 84, in 20 families.

References 

Populated places in Khatam County